Kresnik or Krsnik may refer to:

People
 Johann Kresnik (b. 1939), Austrian choreographer
 Julius or Ludger Will Kresnik, characters in Tales of Xillia 2
 Dora Krsnik (b. 1992), Croatian handball player

Other
 Kresnik Ahtreide, a character in Wild Arms 4
 Kresnik Award, a Slovenian literary award
 Kresnik (deity), a Slavic deity
 Krsnik (vampire hunter), a Croatian/Slovenian vampire hunter